Tina Ellen Hobley (born 20 May 1971) is an English actress and radio presenter, best known for her long-running role as Chrissie Williams in the BBC One medical drama series Holby City. Hobley left Holby City in November 2013 after 12 years.

Early life
Hobley was born in Hampstead. She was very shy as a child, and was sent to speech and drama classes in an attempt to counter her introversion. She grew up in the London suburb of Mill Hill and attended Bishop Douglass School in East Finchley. Hobley later transferred to the Webber Douglas Academy of Dramatic Art.

Career

Television
After graduating from the Webber Douglas Academy of Dramatic Art, where she trained from 1990 to 1993, Hobley had a number of roles in a variety of television dramas, including Coronation Street as Samantha Failsworth, Harbour Lights as WPC Melanie Rush and The Bill as Sue Booker.

Hobley is best known for her role as ward sister Chrissie Williams in BBC medical drama Holby City.

Radio
On 3 October 2013, Smooth Radio announced that Hobley would become a presenter on the network, fronting a programme on Sunday mornings.

Hobly presented The Smooth Drive Home on Smooth London from January 2017 until July 2019.

Theatre
From January to July 2015 Hobley co-starred with Jamie Lomas, Rik Makarem, Michael McKell and Gray O'Brien in a touring production of Peter James's "Dead Simple".

Personal life
Hobley's first marriage was to graphic designer Steve Wallington in 1998. Their daughter Isabella, 'Bella', was born in April 1999; the couple divorced in 2001.

On 22 April 2006, Hobley announced her engagement to Oliver Wheeler, and they married later that year. Hobley gave birth to their daughter Olivia on 18 April 2008, and on 1 March 2010 to son, Orson. Hobley is a supporter of the Starlight Foundation. She is also an Ambassador for Barnardo's, and supports the Terrence Higgins Trust and the White Hat Rally.

In February 2016 she withdrew from competing in the reality show The Jump after dislocating her shoulder, breaking her arm and rupturing her anterior cruciate ligament. Seven months after sustaining these injuries she still had not fully recovered. The damage to her body had limited her movement to the point where she has been unable to perform basic daily tasks by herself.

Filmography

Guest appearances
2003 TV Moments (2003) - Audience member
This Morning (18 May 2004, 16 November 2010, 14 February 2012) 
Hell's Kitchen (2004) - Episode No. 1.10
The Paul O'Grady Show (2004) - Episode No. 1.22
The Xtra Factor (13 November 2004)
GMTV (22 October 2004)
Comic Relief Does Fame Academy (2005)
Test the Nation: The Big Entertainment Test (2005)
School's Out (2007) - Episode No. 2.3
The One Show (11 February 2009) - Guest
All Star Mr & Mrs (23 May 2009) - Contestant with husband, Oli
Lorraine (27 January 2012) - Guest
Daybreak (28 January, 8 August 2013) - Guest
Big Star's Little Star (2 October 2013) - Contestant with daughter, Olivia
The Paul O'Grady Show (19 November 2013)
Loose Women (30 April 2014)

References

External links
Official website
Tina Hobley on Smooth Radio

1971 births
Living people
English television actresses
English stage actresses
Alumni of the Webber Douglas Academy of Dramatic Art
People from Hampstead
Smooth Network presenters
People from Mill Hill
20th-century English actresses
21st-century English actresses